Below are the traditional chiefs and kings of Zelemu and Wushe people who were later referred to as AmaBhaca

After the death of King Ncapai the kingdom split into two ruling lines:

External links
Bhaca| AmaBhaca

Ethnic groups in South Africa
19th-century monarchs in Africa
South African chiefs
Monarchies of South Africa